Edward Turner Bale (1810 – October 9, 1849), later known by his Spanish name Don Eduardo A. Bale, was a British-born Californian physician, entrepreneur, and ranchero. He is known for having built the Bale Grist Mill in Napa County, California.

Life
Bale arrived from England in Monterey, California in 1837 on the H.M.S. Harriet, having served as the ship's surgeon. He soon became Surgeon-In-Chief of the Mexican Army under General Mariano Vallejo, and on March 21, 1839, married Vallejo's niece Maria Ignacia Soberanes. After becoming a citizen of Mexico in March 1841, in June, Bale was granted the Rancho Carne Humana, which comprised the land between what is now Rutherford and Calistoga, California.

Construction of the Bale Grist Mill located between St. Helena and Calistoga was completed in 1846, the same year the Bear Flag Revolt claimed independence from Mexico. Bale's connection to the Bear Flag Party is uncertain, but there is evidence that they met at his mill before the capture of Sonoma. Several of Bale's acquaintances were members of the Bear Flag Party.

During the California Gold Rush, Bale tried his hand at mining, and eventually caught a fever from which he never recovered. He died on October 9, 1849.

Legacy
On December 26, 1860, his daughter Carolina married winemaker Charles Krug. Bale's wife made sure the daughter was protected in a prenuptial that allowed for her to keep  of land north of St. Helena, California, on which Krug planted a vineyard.

Bale, California is named for him.

References

 Napa County Chronology, based on information from the book From Golden Fields to Purple Harvest
 WineDay: How to Start a Winery by Fred McMillin
 reproduced at pashnit.com: Bale Grist Mill brochure
 Dean Albertson, 1949, Dr. Edward Turner Bale, Incorrigible Californio, California Historical Society Quarterly, Vol. 28, No. 3 (Sep., 1949), pp. 259–269

19th-century English medical doctors
People of the Conquest of California
Mexican people of the Mexican–American War
American people of the Mexican–American War
1810 births
1849 deaths
American emigrants to Mexico
English emigrants to the United States
Naturalized citizens of Mexican California
People from Napa County, California
History of Napa County, California